Urla is a town and the center of the district of the same name in İzmir Province, in Turkey. The district center is located in the middle of the isthmus of a small peninsula which protrudes northwards in the Gulf of İzmir, but its urban tissue is comparatively loose and extends eastwards to touch the coast and to cover a wide area which also includes a large portion of the peninsula. Sizable parts in the municipal area, owned by absentee landlords, remain uninhabited or are very rural in aspect. The peninsular coastline present a number of compounds constituted by seasonal residences along the beaches and the coves and which are administratively divided between Urla center's municipal area or its depending villages.

Urla district area's eastern end neighbors the westernmost district of the Greater Metropolitan Area of İzmir, Güzelbahçe, and urbanization is much denser across that part, contributing to the whole district's average urbanization rate of 75%. Urla district nevertheless manages to preserve an overall outlook of a pleasant suburb and resort, and as it extends to the west along Karaburun Peninsula, where it borders on the districts of Çeşme and Karaburun, secondary residences built along the coast or large farms of the interior, as well as native villages, all bearing typical Aegean characteristics, increase in number. To the south, Urla district neighbors that of Seferihisar and the settlement pattern is thinner in that section, with even some empty land, although housing projects targeting İzmir's professional classes start to show a rising interest for that section as well. In economic terms, agricultural products, and especially the fresh produce for the vast nearby market of İzmir, occupy a prominent place in Urla's economy, with fish, poultry and flowers standing out.

An international Artichoke Festival is celebrated since 2015.

The name "Urla" is derived from the Greek Βουρλά ("Vourla") meaning marshlands and the town was cited as such in western sources until the 20th century. Bryela (Byzantine name meaning Woman of God i.e. Holy Maria) whereas it has been suggested that due to the transposition of vowels Bryela has become Vourla, meaning marshlands. Urla is where the ancient city of Klazomenai is located and its remains are much visited, while the name lives on in the unofficial appellation used in the region for part of the coastline of the district, "Kilizman"  which is a still-used derivative of Klazomenai. (Former name of Güzelbahçe). With literacy among the highest in Turkey at 97%, Urla is also home to İzmir Institute of Technology. Urla prides itself for having raised two important men of letters, Giorgos Seferis and Necati Cumalı.

Administration
Urla town center is made up by 23 officially constituted and delimited quarters. Among these, the neighborhoods located on the coastline, such as İskele and Zeytinalanı quarters, play a key role in the town's pace, especially as places of gathering. The district counts 14 villages. Since the building of the highway, the population increases at a regular rate of 4 per cent a year, although the district is still placed in the lower end of ranking of İzmir's districts on the basis of their population.

Economy

Secondary and/or seasonal residences continue to play a key role in Urla's economy, as demonstrated by the high number of residences (26,000 in all for the district) as compared to its population. Although Urla is keen to upgrade its arguments as a tourism destination with a wider appeal, the number of beds available in its accommodation units remains rather modest at only 185.

Urla's fish restaurants and other local specialties, notably a layered pastry called "katmer" is famous. Urla's name is also associated in Turkey with a particular breed of "okra", red in color, called "kınalı bamya" in Turkish.

While there are no large shopping malls in Urla, mid-size distributors and small commerces abound, especially in the coastal section of the district center. The total number of companies for the district as a whole was 1,812 in 2007. There are four banks operating through four branches in Urla.

In 2006, the district realized exports reaching 524,068 US Dollars, mostly agricultural products with added value. Some marble and lime is quarried but the contribution of mining activities to the general economy of the district is low. The same can be said for industrial activities in general, which are almost exclusively based on agriculture or livestock. The three small industrial zones present in the district center since the 1990s, employing about 650 people, usually house enterprises focused on maintenance and reparation activities.

Agricultural production remains the determinant activity for much of the district. In the district's total agricultural area of 971.5 hectares, 21% of which is irrigable, 36% is accounted by olive orchards and 17% by vegetable gardens. There are about six hundred thousand olive trees across the district. Although fruits and vegetables in general, and citrus fruits, vineyards, decorative plants and flowers (especially chrysanthemum, hyacinth, narcissus and carnation) in particular, correspond for each only to 1 or 2 per cent of the total area used for agriculture, their added value for the district economy as a whole is significant.

Agriculture based on greenhouse cultivation acquired an increasing importance in Urla in recent years, especially in the villages near the town center, as well in parts of the municipal area that are still open for agricultural production. Urla quarters of Zeytinalanı and İçmeler and the nearby village of Kuşçular stand out with their greenhouses focused on vegetable production, and those in the villages of Bademler and Özbek on flowers, the total number of households engaged in greenhouse cultivation (both vegetables and decorative plants) being around 400 according to İzmir Chamber of Commerce figures. The same source cites the figures for the number of commercial enterprises occupied with this branch of agricultural activity as 26, the total area reserved for greenhouse farming as being around 1,500 decares, with 91 varieties cultivated. In Urla there are to date no certified enterprises engaged in organic farming, a new form of agriculture in which a number of new ventures made a name in İzmir city's eastern neighboring district of Kemalpaşa.

17 per cent of the district's land, although suitable for agriculture, is still unused currently.

In livestock breeding, poultry stands well above other livestock, a population of around 2 million chicken and perhaps up to eighty thousand turkey having been estimated for the district. 25 poultry enterprises present in Urla operate as subcontractors on behalf of Turkey's national brands in the industry. The count for bovine and ovine animals in Urla range between 5 and 8 thousand and some small-scale apiculture is also done. 220 tonnes of fish was caught across Urla shoreline in 2007, principally sea bass, gilthead bream and red mullet, the fishing activities being organized around five cooperatives and catering Urla's fish restaurants or İzmir's fish markets. Eleven fish farming enterprises are present in the coastal areas of four villages (Balıklıova, Gülbahçe, Uzunkuyu, Zeytinler).

There are 6 stock farms (horse breeding and care) and two enterprises engaged in dog breeding and care in Urla.

Education and Health
There are 16 students for each teacher and 492 patients for each doctor in Urla.

History

Limantepe

Information on Urla region's pre-Hellenistic history is quite recent, based on the excavations in Limantepe pursued by an international team since 1979. Some researchers refer in its context to the possible most ancient regularly used port in the world.

Klazomenai - Kilizman

Urla was an important cultural centre also in its Hellenistic period. It was the site of the Ionian city of Klazomenai. Pieces of art and sculpture found during excavations are now exhibited in the Louvre or in İzmir Archaeology Museum.

The oldest attested olive oil production facilities were recently discovered in Klazomenai. The traces also indicate first exports of olive oil by way of sea.

Olive oil extraction installation (işlik) dating back to the third quarter of the 6th century BC uncovered in Klazomenai is the only surviving example of a level and weights press from an ancient Greek city and precedes by at least two centuries the next securely datable earliest presses found in Greece. It was restored and reconstructed in 2004-2005 through collaboration between Ege University, a Turkish olive-oil exporter and a German natural building components company, as well as by local artisans, on the basis of the clearly visible millstone with a cylindrical roller and three separation pits. The olive oil obtained turned out to be quite a success in business terms as well.

Turkish era
In the summit of Ottoman power, during the 16th century, Urla was almost entirely incorporated into the pious foundation established by Ayşe Hafsa Sultan for the revenues and the maintenance of the complex she had had built in Manisa in the 1520s. With the decline of the Ottoman power, the town, placed along with the entire peninsula at the frontier of the Aegean Sea difficult to control, frequently saw itself at the mercy of plunderers. İzmir's rise as an international trade port partially relieved Urla from its security concerns, while it also gradually increased its dependency to the neighboring metropolis. A quarantine center was established in Urla in 1865 through French initiative, in the island opposite Urla quay that bears today the very name of Karantina, and where part of the site of ancient Klazomenai also extends. The center was in service until the 1950s, now transformed into a state hospital and an annexed summer camp, although the quarantine installations are still standing. Prior to the foundation of the quarantine center, Admiral Charles Napier had spent the winter of 1839-1840 here, before intervening, along with allied Turkish troops, against Muhammad Ali of Egypt in Lebanon. From 1867 until 1922, Urla was part of the Aidin Vilayet of the Ottoman Empire. The town's and its municipality's population in 1914 were composed of 9.361 Turks, 24.711 Greeks, 423 Jews, 51 Bulgarians and 42 Armenians.

Seferis and Cumalı
Urla had two important men of letters among his sons: It is the birthplace of the Greek poet and Nobel-laureate Giorgos Seferis and the Turkish novelist Necati Cumalı (born in Florina and re-settled in the framework of the 1923 Exchange of Greek and Turkish Populations) grew up in Urla.

Archaeology 
In January 2021, archaeologists headed by Elif Koparal, announced the discovery of the ruins of a 2500 year-old temple of Aphrodite from the 5th century BC. Among other findings in and around the temple, they found a statue piece depicting a woman, a terracotta female head and an inscription that reads, "This is the sacred area". The traces of the temple were first excavated in 2016.

Notable people 
 Soner Ergençay, Turkish football player
 Duygu Sakallı, Turkish handballer
 Giorgos Seferis, Greek poet and diplomat, Nobel Prize in Literature 1963
 Georgios Afthonidis, Greek member of the Filiki Eteria and worker of the Ecumenical Patriarchate

Festivals 

 Urla Artichoke Festival
 Mart Dokuzu Herb Festival

See also

 Limantepe
 Klazomenai
 İzmir Institute of Technology

References

External links

 Urla news portal

Resources

 
 Urla's names as referred to by Dr. Mahmut Tolon

Populated places in İzmir Province
Tourist attractions in İzmir Province
Districts of İzmir Province
Former_Greek_towns_in_Turkey
Ancient Greek archaeological sites in Turkey